One Man Drives While the Other Man Screams is Pere Ubu's second live album, covering the years 1978-1981 (dovetailing with their previous live release, 390° of Simulated Stereo, which covered 1976-1978).  After remaining out-of-print for many years, the album was reissued in 2004.

Track listing
"Navvy"  – 2:53
"Street Waves"  – 4:16
"Heaven"  – 3:09
"On the Surface"  – 2:37
"Dub Housing"  – 5:10
"Caligari's Mirror"  – 3:58
"Small Was Fast"  – 3:19
"Misery Goats"  – 2:49
"Go"  – 3:57
"Ubu Dance Party"  – 4:32
"Birdies"  – 3:06
"Rhapsody in Pink"  – 5:21
"Codex"  – 2:29

Personnel
Pere Ubu
David Thomas - vocals
Mayo Thompson - guitar
Tom Herman - guitar
Allen Ravenstine - EML synthesizers
Tony Maimone - bass guitar
Scott Krauss - drums

References

Pere Ubu albums
1989 live albums
Rough Trade Records live albums